The Sustainable Development Education Center is an educational center in Bali District, New Taipei, Taiwan.

History
The organization of the center was created in March 2007 and the center was opened in January 2008.

Architecture
The education center consists of an information desk, exhibition area and multipurpose classrooms educating on wetland management and the effects of global warming. It also has a viewing tower overlooking Tamsui River.

Transportation
The museum is accessible by boat from Tamsui Station of Taipei Metro.

See also
 List of tourist attractions in Taiwan

References

2008 establishments in Taiwan
Buildings and structures completed in 2007
Buildings and structures in New Taipei
Science centers in Taiwan
Tourist attractions in New Taipei